Anna Linda Christine Fagerström  (born 17 March 1977) is a Swedish former football midfielder who played for Bälinge IF, Hammarby IF and Djurgårdens/Älvsjö in the Damallsvenskan and Bollstanäs SK in Division 1. With Djurgårdens she played the 2005 European Cup's final.

She was a member of the Swedish national team, playing the 1999 and 2003 World Cups and the 2000 and 2004 Summer Olympics. She made her senior debut against Norway in February 1997 after 17 caps at Under–21 level. Fagerström also competed for Sweden at the 2001 European Championship, scoring the winning goal against Russia on the final day of group play to send her team on to the Semi-Finals.

Matches and goals scored at World Cup & Olympic tournaments

Matches and goals scored at European Championship tournaments

Honours

Club 
 Djurgården/Älvsjö 
 Damallsvenskan (2): 2003, 2004

References

Match reports

1977 births
Living people
Swedish women's footballers
Footballers at the 2000 Summer Olympics
Footballers at the 2004 Summer Olympics
Olympic footballers of Sweden
Damallsvenskan players
Hammarby Fotboll (women) players
Djurgårdens IF Fotboll (women) players
Sweden women's international footballers
Bälinge IF players
Women's association football midfielders
2003 FIFA Women's World Cup players
1999 FIFA Women's World Cup players
People from Upplands Väsby Municipality
Sportspeople from Stockholm County